The Tanners' Mosque is a historic mosque located near the Tanners' Bridge in Tirana, capital of Albania. Built in the neighborhood of the handicraft-trade Tanners' guild around the seventeenth century in the Ottoman Empire, it was damaged by a lightning shot but continues to function thanks to improvements made by the family Resmja which even today continues to care for.

The current preacher (imam) of the mosque is the theologian Elvis Naçi.

See also
 Muslim Community of Albania
 Islam in Albania

References 
 Tanners' Mosque (Albanian)

Mosques in Tirana
17th-century mosques
Ottoman mosques
Ottoman Albania